Frances was a New Zealand thoroughbred racemare foaled in 1942 by Bulandshar (GB) out of Trivet (NZ). She won a number of major races including the 1948 Auckland Cup.

Big race wins
 1948 Auckland Cup

See also

 Thoroughbred racing in New Zealand

1942 racehorse births
Thoroughbred family 27
Racehorses bred in New Zealand
Racehorses trained in New Zealand
Auckland Cup winners